Dr. James White House was a historic home located at Hartstown, West Fallowfield Township, Crawford County, Pennsylvania.  The main section was built in 1835, and was a two-story, frame dwelling in a vernacular Greek Revival style. A one-story addition with porch was added at a later date. It was dismantled in the early 1980s.

It was added to the National Register of Historic Places in 1980 and delisted in 2004.

References

Houses on the National Register of Historic Places in Pennsylvania
Greek Revival houses in Pennsylvania
Houses completed in 1835
Houses in Crawford County, Pennsylvania
National Register of Historic Places in Crawford County, Pennsylvania